Franklinite is an oxide mineral belonging to the normal spinel subgroup's iron (Fe) series, with the formula Zn2+Fe23+O4.  

As with another spinel member magnetite, both ferrous (2+) and ferric (3+) iron may be present in franklinite samples. Divalent iron and/or manganese (Mn) may commonly accompany zinc (Zn) and trivalent manganese may substitute for some ferric iron.

At its type locality, franklinite can be found with a wide array of minerals, many of which are fluorescent. More commonly, it occurs with willemite, calcite, and zincite. In these rocks, it forms as disseminated small black crystals with their octahedral faces visible at times. It may rarely be found as a single large euhedral crystal.

Franklinite is a major ore of the element zinc. It is named after its local discovery at the Franklin Mine and Sterling Hill Mines in New Jersey.

See also

 Spinel
 Classification of minerals
 List of minerals

References

 Mindat page for franklinite

External links

Spinel group
Iron(III) minerals
Zinc minerals
Cubic minerals
Minerals in space group 227
Minerals described in 1819